Alan Shealy (born August 15, 1953) is an American rower. He competed in the men's eight event at the 1976 Summer Olympics. He graduated from Harvard University.

References

External links
 
 

1953 births
Living people
American male rowers
Olympic rowers of the United States
Rowers at the 1976 Summer Olympics
Sportspeople from Fitchburg, Massachusetts
Harvard Crimson rowers
Pan American Games medalists in rowing
Pan American Games gold medalists for the United States
Pan American Games bronze medalists for the United States
Rowers at the 1975 Pan American Games
Rowers at the 1979 Pan American Games